Elusa ustula is a moth of the family Noctuidae. It is found in Peninsular Malaysia, Borneo and Taiwan.

The wingspan is about 19 mm. The forewings are deep, rich brown and only weakly marked.

References

Moths described in 1909
Hadeninae
Moths of Malaysia
Moths of Borneo
Moths of Taiwan